The Party in the Valley Tour was the second concert tour by Australian recording artist Betty Who. The tour supported her second studio album The Valley (2017). The tour began on 12 April 2017, in New Haven, Connecticut and ended on 31 March 2018, in St. Petersburg, Florida.

Set list
This set list is representative of the show on 15 April 2017. It does not represent all dates throughout the tour.

 "The Valley"
 "Glory Days"
 "You Can Cry Tomorrow"
 "Human Touch"
 "Make You Memories"
 "Pretend You're Missing Me"
 "Heartbreak Dream"
 "Free to Fly"
 "Blue Heaven Midnight Crush"
 "Beautiful"
 "California Rain"
 "Wanna Be"
 "Some Kinda Wonderful"
 "Just Like Me"
 "All of You"
 "Mama Say"
 "High Society"
Encore
 "I Love You Always Forever"
 "Somebody Loves You"

Shows

References

2017 concert tours
2018 concert tours